Kilmarnock and Irvine Valley is a constituency of the Scottish Parliament (Holyrood) covering part of the council area of East Ayrshire. It elects one Member of the Scottish Parliament (MSP) by the plurality (first past the post) method of election. It is also one of nine constituencies in the South Scotland electoral region, which elects seven additional members, in addition to the nine constituency MSPs, to produce a form of proportional representation for the region as a whole.

The seat was created for the 2011 Scottish Parliament election, following the redrawing and renaming of the old Kilmarnock and Loudoun constituency which had been in the Central Scotland region. It has been held continuously by Willie Coffey of the  Scottish National Party, who was previously the member for Kilmarnock and Loudoun.

Electoral region 

The other eight constituencies of the South Scotland region are Ayr, Carrick, Cumnock and Doon Valley, Clydesdale, Dumfriesshire, East Lothian, Ettrick, Roxburgh and Berwickshire, Galloway and West Dumfries and Midlothian South, Tweeddale and Lauderdale.

The region covers the Dumfries and Galloway council area, part of the East Ayrshire council area, part of the East Lothian council area, part of the Midlothian council area, the Scottish Borders council area, the South Ayrshire council area and part of the South Lanarkshire council area.

Constituency boundaries and council area 

East Ayrshire is represented in the Scottish Parliament by two constituencies: Carrick, Cumnock and Doon Valley and Kilmarnock and Irvine Valley.

The electoral wards in the Kilmarnock and Irvine Valley constituency are listed below. All of these wards are part of East Ayrshire:

Annick 
Kilmarnock North
Kilmarnock West and Crosshouse
Kilmarnock East and Hurlford
Kilmarnock South
Irvine Valley

Constituency profile 
The Kilmarnock and Irvine Valley constituency is a part-urban part-rural constituency located along the northern half of the East Ayrshire council area. Towards the south-west of the constituency is the town of Kilmarnock and its adjoining towns and villages. Kilmarnock is a former industrial town which is mostly made up of social housing, with some suburban housing towards the western end of the town. To the east of the town, along the valley of the River Irvine, is a string of industrial towns and villages such as Galston and Newmilns located within the parish of Loudoun. The region was once dependent upon the manufacture of textiles before the industry's collapse throughout the mid-20th Century. The north of the constituency is mostly made up of farmlands, with the historic town of Stewarton lying directly north of Kilmarnock along the Annick Water.

Member of the Scottish Parliament

Election results

2020s

2010s

References

External links

Scottish Parliament constituencies and regions from 2011
Politics of Kilmarnock
Politics of East Ayrshire
Constituencies of the Scottish Parliament
Constituencies established in 2011
2011 establishments in Scotland
Stewarton
Galston, East Ayrshire
Darvel